This is a list of football clubs located in Brazil. The list is sorted alphabetically by state and includes both active and inactive clubs. These football clubs are all associated with the Brazilian Football Confederation. As with many other football leagues, the structure has changed frequently, including its implementation of the same configuration of European leagues in 2003.

List of clubs sorted by state

Acre
State championship: Campeonato Acriano

Alagoas
State championship: Campeonato Alagoano

Defunct clubs

Amapá
State championship: Campeonato Amapaense

Amazonas
State championship: Campeonato Amazonense

Defunct clubs

Bahia
State championship: Campeonato Baiano

Defunct clubs

Ceará
State championship: Campeonato Cearense

Distrito Federal
State championship: Campeonato Brasiliense

Defunct clubs

Espírito Santo
State championship: Campeonato Capixaba

Defunct clubs

Goiás
State championship: Campeonato Goiano

Defunct clubs

Maranhão
State championship: Campeonato Maranhense

Mato Grosso
State championship: Campeonato Mato-Grossense

Defunct clubs

Mato Grosso do Sul
State championship: Campeonato Sul-Mato-Grossense

Defunct clubs

Minas Gerais
State championship: Campeonato Mineiro

Defunct clubs

Pará
State championship: Campeonato Paraense

Defunct clubs

Paraíba
State championship: Campeonato Paraibano

Defunct clubs

Paraná
State championship: Campeonato Paranaense

Defunct clubs

Pernambuco
State championship: Campeonato Pernambucano

Defunct clubs

Piauí
State championship: Campeonato Piauiense

Defunct clubs

Rio de Janeiro

State championship: Campeonato Carioca

Defunct clubs

Rio Grande do Norte
State championship: Campeonato Potiguar

Rio Grande do Sul
State championship: Campeonato Gaúcho

Defunct clubs

Rondônia
State championship: Campeonato Rondoniense

Defunct clubs

Roraima
State championship: Campeonato Roraimense

Santa Catarina
State championship: Campeonato Catarinense

Defunct clubs

São Paulo
State championship: Campeonato Paulista

Defunct clubs

Sergipe
State championship: Campeonato Sergipano

Tocantins
State championship: Campeonato Tocantinense

See also
 List of women's football clubs in Brazil

References

External links
 RSSSF Brasil
 Times Brasileiros

 
Brazil
Clubs
Football clubs